Benediction is a play by Eric Schmiedl, based on the novel Benediction by Kent Haruf, about a small fictional town called Holt, Colorado.  There is an old man named Dad Louis, and the story is around him. He ends up dying from cancer.

Cast
Dad Louis - Mike Hartman
Mary Louis - Joyce Cohen
Rob Lyle - Ed Martin
Beverly Lyle - Nancy Lemenager
John Wesley Lyle - Nick Lamedica
Alene Johnson - Nance Williamson
Willa Johnson - Billie McBride
Lorraine Louis - Kathleen McCall
Genevieve Larson - Amelia Corrada
Alice - Zoe Stahlhut
Berta May - Lelsie O'Caroll
Luann - Tracy Shaffer

References

American plays
Plays based on novels
Colorado in fiction